The Eastern Amateur is an annual amateur golf tournament. It has been played at Elizabeth Manor Golf and Country Club in Portsmouth, Virginia since 1957; the only exceptions were in 1977 when it was played at Sleepy Hole Golf Course in Suffolk, Virginia and in 1999 when it was played at nearby Bide-A-Wee Golf Course in Portsmouth during renovations at Elizabeth Manor.

Winners

External links

List of top finishers

Amateur golf tournaments in the United States
Golf in Virginia
Sports in Hampton Roads
Recurring sporting events established in 1957